Bazley may refer to:

Bazley, KwaZulu-Natal, residential beach town along the South Coast of Durban, KwaZulu-Natal
Bazley baronets, of Hatherop in the County of Gloucester, a title in the Baronetage of the United Kingdom
John Bazley White (1848–1927), English cement manufacturer and Conservative politician
Darius Bazley American professional basketball player for the Oklahoma City Thunder